Cardfight!! Vanguard G: NEXT is the fourth season of Cardfight!! Vanguard G and the eighth season overall in the Cardfight!! Vanguard series. It began airing in Japan on October 2, 2016, and finished airing in Japan on October 1, 2017.

Plot
The story takes place five months after Stride Gate, in which Chrono, Shion, and Tokoha have gone their separate ways by enrolling in different high schools. Chrono enrolled to Tokyo Metropolitan Harumi High School, Shion enrolled in Fukuhara high and Tokoha went to France for her studies. They later form their own teams to enter the Vanguard U20 Championship. Chrono forms a new team with Taiyou Asukawa and Kazuma Shouji, a gloomy boy who studies in the same high school as Chrono. Shion made a team with Henry Hayao (The captain of Fukuhara High Vanguard club) and Rin Hashima. Tokoha with Satoru Enishi and Kumi Okazaki. However the current U20 Champion and his team are under the control of  units from Cray, who plan to use the U20 as a way to destroy the connection of Earth and Cray. The new teams of Chrono, Shion, and Tokoha must work together while competing against each other or risk losing Vanguard forever.

Main characters 
The main characters of the season are:

 Chrono Shindou
 Shion Kiba
 Tokoha Anjou
 Taiyou Asukawa
 Satoru Enishi
 Rin Hashima
 Kumi Okazaki
 Kazuma Shouji
 Henri Hayao
 Kazumi Onimaru

Antagonists 
The antagonists of the season are:

 Kazumi Onimaru (Diffriden by Stealth Dragon, Shiranui)
 Saori Fuchidaka (Diffriden by Dumjid)
 Verno Fahrenheart (Diffriden by Prime Beauty, Amaruda)
 Noa Hoshizaki (Diffriden by Chaos Breaker)

Theme songs
Opening theme
“Hello, Mr. Wonderland” by Ayako Nakanomori (eps. 295-319)
“→Next Generation" by Psychic Lover (eps. 320-346)
Ending theme
 "Wing of Image" by Rummy Labyrinth (Haruka Kudō and Aimi Terakawa) (eps. 295-307 in Japanese; 295-present in English dub)
 "Are you ready to FIGHT" by Raychell (eps. 308-319)
 "Pleasure Stride" by Milky Holmes (eps. 320-332)
 "Natsuninare" by Starmarie (eps. 333-346)

Episode list

References

2016 Japanese television seasons
2017 Japanese television seasons
Cardfight!! Vanguard